My Aunt from Honfleur (French: Ma tante d'Honfleur) is a 1931 French comedy film directed by André Gillois and starring Florelle, Jim Gérald and Jeanne Cheirel. It is based on the 1914 play My Aunt from Honfleur by Paul Gavault. Produced in 1931 it was not given a full release until March the following year.

Cast
 Florelle as Albertine
 Jim Gérald as Charles Berthier
 Jeanne Cheirel as La tante d'Honfleur
 Charles Fallot as M. Dorlange	
 Louisa de Mornand as  Mme Dorlange
 Yvonne Garat	as 	Yvonne Leblond
 Robert Goupil as 	Clément
 Daniel Lecourtois	 as Adolphe
 Robert Pizani	as le docteur Douce
 Rolla France as Lucette

References

Bibliography 
 Goble, Alan. The Complete Index to Literary Sources in Film. Walter de Gruyter, 1999.

External links 
 

1931 films
French comedy films
1931 comedy films
1930s French-language films
Films directed by André Gillois
French films based on plays
1930s French films